Antonio Luisi (born 7 October 1994) is a Luxembourger international footballer who plays for Progrès Niederkorn, as a winger.

Career
Luisi has played club football for Racing Luxembourg and FC Differdange 03.

He made his senior international debut for Luxembourg in 2013.

References

External links
 

1994 births
Living people
Luxembourgian footballers
Luxembourg international footballers
Racing FC Union Luxembourg players
FC Differdange 03 players
F91 Dudelange players
Jeunesse Esch players
Luxembourg National Division players
Association football wingers